USA Trains is a manufacturer of G scale model railroad products that started out as Charles Ro Manufacturing Company. They  offer two different scale sizes of trains that use the same track; the "Ultimate Series," which is 1:29 scale, and the "American" and "Work Trains" series which is 1:24 scale. USA Trains claims to have the largest collection of G scale rolling stock in the world.  USA Trains was established in 1987.

Charles Ro Supply Company

USA Trains started out as part of Charles Ro Supply Company, the biggest train store, as well as America's largest Lionel dealer. USA Trains is a family-run business, started by father and son Charles Ro senior and junior.

Lionel

Charles Ro Supply Company was established in and it started out as a beauty shop business of 4 salons with sixty hair-dressers but moved into the hobby business when Charles Ro, Sr. began selling used Lionel trains at one of the storefronts in Everett, Massachusetts. In 1972, Ro started purchasing directly from Lionel to sell them mail-order. By 1980, Ro had completed Lionel's first million dollar order. Also at this time, the company moved to a new location in Malden, Massachusetts into an old supermarket building.

Garden trains

In 1982, Lionel moved production to Mexico, not producing model trains for 9 months. To make up for this, Ro began selling German-made large-scale model trains that were suitable for outdoor use. Realizing their popularity, Ro began making his own large scale model trains under the name Charles Ro Manufacturing Company. Until 1995, when manufacturing was moved offshore, USA Trains were manufactured at this new location which also served as the store. USA Trains manufactures locomotives, boxcars, work trains, and an extensive line of billboard reefers—early 20th century iced refrigerator cars with billboard-style advertising graphics on their sides. Many of these are limited edition collectibles, and in addition to prototypical cars, the reefer series includes special commemoratives and dated holiday-themed cars.

Awards/Recognition

In 1998, the GP 7/9 locomotive won Model Railroader's Reader's Choice Award
The Ultimate Series line introduced in 1999 won four Reader's Choice Awards
In 2003, USA Trains J1e Hudson won the 2003 Reader's Choice Award
USA Trains claims to have the world's largest selection of G scale rolling stock

References

External links
Official website
Checklist of Charles Ro USA Trains billboard reefers
The history of garden trains

1987 establishments in Massachusetts
American companies established in 1987
Toy companies established in 1987
Toy train manufacturers
Model railroad manufacturers
Companies based in Middlesex County, Massachusetts
Model manufacturers of the United States